Edward Falconer Litton (1827 – 27 November 1890) was an Irish barrister and Liberal Party politician.  He was briefly Member of Parliament (MP) for Tyrone.

Litton was elected to the House of Commons at the general election in October 1880, but left Parliament to take up an appointment as a land commissioner.

References

External links 
 

1827 births
1890 deaths
Members of the Parliament of the United Kingdom for County Tyrone constituencies (1801–1922)
Irish Liberal Party MPs
UK MPs 1880–1885
Irish barristers